"We Want Your Soul" is a song by British DJ and producer Adam Freeland; the song made the top 40 charts in several countries, and resulted in an award-winning music video. It is the first song to which Freeland wrote the lyrics; he describes it as being "about the destructive side of consumer culture".

Rather than being sung, the song's verses are spoken by a speech synthesizer; the song also features a sample of Bill Hicks. The song has been remixed by drum and bass duo Ed Rush & Optical, electronic band Product.01 and Australian dance trio Infusion.

Freeland later reported that the Target Corporation sought to license We Want Your Soul for use in an advertising campaign, which he refused.

Austrian electronic music duo Klangkarussell created a remix of the song. It was originally released in 2011 through the duo's SoundCloud profile before being including in their 2014 debut album Netzwerk.

The track was also used with a new video introduction to open the main stages at Boomtown Festival 2017.

Track listings
CD single
 We Want Your Soul (Radio Edit)  – 3:00
 We Want Your Soul (Product 01 Remix)  – 4:46
 We Want Your Soul (Infusion Remix)  – 6:16
 We Want Your Soul (Ed Rush & Optical Remix)  - 5:50

12" single
 We Want Your Soul (Club Mix)
 We Want Your Soul (Acapella)
 We Want Your Soul (Lock Grooves)

Remix 12"
 We Want Your Soul (Ed Rush & Optical Remix)
 We Want Your Soul (Infusion Remix)

References

External links

2003 singles
Songs about consumerism